The Personal Flight Sky-Bike is an American paramotor that was designed and produced by Personal Flight of Kent, Washington for powered paragliding. Now out of production, when it was available the aircraft was supplied as a kit for amateur construction.

Design and development
The Sky-Bike was designed to comply with the US FAR 103 Ultralight Vehicles rules. It features a paraglider-style wing, single-place or two-place-in-tandem accommodation, depending on the model and a single engine in pusher configuration. As is the case with all paramotors, take-off and landing is accomplished by foot.

The aircraft is built from welded aluminium tubing. Inflight steering is accomplished via handles that actuate the canopy brakes, creating roll and yaw.

The manufacturer estimates the construction time from the supplied kit as just a few minutes, without special tools.

Variants
Sky-Bike
Sky-Bike ZR 250 BI
Sky-Bike Trike
Powered parachute adaptation, with the addition of a three-wheeled carriage.

Specifications (Sky-Bike ZR 250 BI)

References

Sky-Bike
1990s United States ultralight aircraft
Single-engined pusher aircraft
Paramotors